Popeye the Sailor is a cartoon fictional character created by Elzie Crisler Segar.

Popeye the Sailor may refer to:

 Popeye the Sailor (film), a 1933 animated short that is billed as a Betty Boop cartoon
 Popeye the Sailor (TV series), an American animated television series
 Popeye the Sailor (film series), an American animated series of comedy short films